Cryptantha minima, common names little cryptantha, little catseye or small cryptantha, is a small, herbaceous annual of the family Boraginaceae. It is found in the semi-arid grasslands and intermontane basins of central North America from Alberta to Texas. Cryptantha minima is listed in Canada under the Species at Risk Act as endangered.

References

minima
Flora of Alberta
Flora of Saskatchewan
Flora of Montana
Flora of Wyoming
Flora of South Dakota
Flora of Nebraska
Flora of Colorado
Flora of Kansas
Flora of Arizona
Flora of New Mexico
Flora of Oklahoma
Flora of Texas